Loboschiza koenigiana, the orange tortricid moth or leaf webber, is a moth of the family Tortricidae. The species was first described by Johan Christian Fabricius in 1775. It is found in the United Arab Emirates, Pakistan, India, Sri Lanka, Myanmar, China, Malaysia, Thailand, Java in Indonesia, New Guinea, Queensland in Australia, the Philippines, Taiwan, Japan and Korea.

The wingspan is about 12 mm. The forewings are yellow with a broad brown margin, and covered with irregular bright orange lines and spots.

The larvae feed on Azadirachta indica, Melia azedarach, Owenia venosa, Aglaia sapindina, Jasminum sambac and Hibiscus rosa-sinensis.

References

Moths described in 1775
Enarmoniini
Taxa named by Johan Christian Fabricius